Mark Kerr may refer to:

Military
Lord Mark Kerr (British Army officer, born 1676) (1676–1752), British general and military governor, Governor of Sheerness, and Governor of Edinburgh Castle
Lord Mark Kerr (Royal Navy officer) (1776–1840), British admiral, contender for Antrim (UK Parliament constituency)
Lord Mark Kerr (British Army officer, born 1817) (1817−1900), British general, nephew of the above
Mark Kerr (Royal Navy officer, born 1864) (1864−1944), British admiral and Royal Air Force general, nephew of the above
Mark Kerr (Royal Navy officer, born 1949), British admiral

Others
Mark Kerr (abbot) (died 1584), Abbot of Newbattle, Scotland
Mark Kerr, 1st Earl of Lothian (1553−1609), Scottish nobleman and politician
Mark Kerr (fighter) (born 1968), American mixed martial artist and collegiate wrestler
Mark Kerr (footballer) (born 1982), Scottish footballer